

This is a list of the National Register of Historic Places listings in Washington County, Tennessee.

This is intended to be a complete list of the properties and districts on the National Register of Historic Places in Washington County, Tennessee, United States. Latitude and longitude coordinates are provided for many National Register properties and districts; these locations may be seen together in a map.

There are 37 properties and districts listed on the National Register in the county. One site has been further designated a National Historic Landmark. Three other sites were once listed, but have since been removed.

See also National Register of Historic Places listings in Carter County, Tennessee for additional properties in Johnson City, a city that spans the county line.

Current listings

|}

Former listings

|}

See also

 List of National Historic Landmarks in Tennessee
 National Register of Historic Places listings in Tennessee

References

Washington